The Men's sprint race of the 2016 FIL World Luge Championships was held on 29 January 2016.

Results
The qualification run was started at 11:15 and the final run at 16:01.

References

Men's sprint